Retinia arizonensis, the pinyon pitch nodule moth, is a species of moth of the family Tortricidae. It is found in North America.

The wingspan is about 19 mm. Adults are rusty brown. The forewings are mottled with brown, white and silver scales. There is one generation with a peak flight period in late July and early August

The larvae feed on pinyon pine. They feed on the terminal growth, causing twig dieback. Young larvae first feed on the young needle tissue before tunnelling into shoots. A round nodule of purple-red pitch from which the larvae feed is produced around the feeding site. The larvae are reddish yellow with a black head. The species overwinters in the larval stage within the pitch nodule.

References

Moths described in 1920
Eucosmini